The 1500 metres speed skating event for women was part of the demonstration sport programme of the 1932 Winter Olympics. The competition was held on Wednesday, February 10, 1932.

Ten speed skaters from two nations competed.

Like all other speed skating events at this Olympics the competition was held in pack-style format, having all competitors skate at the same time.

Podium

Records
These were the standing world and Olympic records (in minutes) prior to the 1932 Winter Olympics.

(*) The record was set in a high altitude venue (more than 1000 metres above sea level) and on naturally frozen ice.

All three runs were faster than the world record, but in pack-style format.

Results

First round

Heat 1

Heat 2

Final

References
Official Olympic Report

Women's speed skating at the 1932 Winter Olympics
Oly
Skat